The Service Advertising Protocol (SAP) is included in the Internetwork Packet Exchange (IPX) protocol. SAP makes the process of adding and removing services on an IPX internetwork dynamic. SAP was maintained by Novell.

As servers are booted up, they may advertise their services using SAP; when they are brought down, they use SAP to indicate that their services will no longer be available. IPX network servers may use SAP to identify themselves by name and service type. All entities that use SAP must broadcast a name and Service Type that (together) are unique throughout the entire IPX internetwork. This policy is enforced by system administrators and application developers.

SAP Service Types

Further reading

Novell NetWare
Network protocols